The women's 100 metres hurdles at the 2015 World Championships in Athletics was held at the Beijing National Stadium on 27 and 28 August.

Summary
Brianna Rollins of the United States entered the competition as the defending champion.  Coming into this meet, on paper, this was an American event as eight of the top ten athletes in the world were Americans, but even with the returning champion, only four could compete here.  The returning silver medalist, reigning Olympic Champion and two-time winner Sally Pearson could not return due to a tragic accident in Rome, so the best the world could offer was returning bronze medalist Tiffany Porter.  But the hurdles require execution.

Two of the Americans disappeared in the semi-finals, Kendra Harrison by false start, 2008 Olympic Champion Dawn Harper-Nelson falling flat at the second hurdle.  Making the finals were Rollins, after a tight battle with Andrea Ivančević and world #1 Sharika Nelvis, along with Porter and Jamaica's version of the Williams sisters, Danielle and Shermaine.  Danielle along with Alina Talay and Cindy Roleder had to run personal bests just to make it into the finals.

In the final, Rollins was clearly the first to the first hurdle, however when she got to the first hurdle she didn't lift her lead leg high enough to clear it instead firmly hitting it with her foot and riding it down.  That slight delay gave Danielle the narrow lead, chased by Porter and Nelvis.  Porter started to move ahead and Rollins started to come back.  At the ninth hurdle, Porter began to lose her balance putting Williams back in the lead.  Bracketing the field, Talay in lane 2 and Roleder in lane 8 were running error free races away from the fireworks in the middle of the track.  By the sixth hurdle, Talay was almost even with Rollins, while Roleder, last over the first hurdle, was steadily gaining.  Coming over the final barrier, Roleder clearly took it the smoothest and had the strongest run to the finish.  A perfectly timed lean almost caught Williams.  In contrast, the off balance Porter lunged at Rollins way too early and tumbled to the track with a full somersault, while Talay efficiently out leaned Rollins for bronze.  It was again a significant personal best for all three medalists with Talay's being a new National Record.

Records
Prior to the competition, the records were as follows:

Qualification standards

Schedule

Results

Heats
Qualification: First 4 in each heat (Q) and the next 4 fastest (q) advanced to the semifinals.

Wind: Heat 1: -1.8 m/s, Heat 2: -1.2 m/s, Heat 3: -1.0 m/s, Heat 4: -0.4 m/s, Heat 5: -1.1 m/s.

Semifinals
Qualification: First 2 in each heat (Q) and the next 2 fastest (q) advanced to the final.

Wind: Heat 1: -0.3 m/s, Heat 2: -0.4 m/s, Heat 3: -0.8 m/s

Final
The final was held at 21:35.

Wind: -0.3 m/s

References

100 metres hurdles
Sprint hurdles at the World Athletics Championships
2015 in women's athletics